Andrew Ammel Ericksen (3 August 1894 – 27 March 1973) was an Australian rules footballer who played for the Richmond Football Club in the Victorian Football League (VFL).

Ericksen was born in Port Melbourne in 1894, as the second son of Danish immigrant Erich Marcus Ericksen (1864–1939) and Lydia Taylor (1869–1945).

Notes

External links 
		

1894 births
1973 deaths
Australian rules footballers from Melbourne
Richmond Football Club players
People from Port Melbourne
Australian people of Danish descent